XOR may mean:
Exclusive or (logic)
XOR cipher, an encryption algorithm
XOR gate
bitwise XOR, an operator used in computer programming
XOR (video game)
XOR, an x200 instruction
Xor DDoS

See also
 Exor (disambiguation)